The list of shipwrecks in 1963 includes all ships sunk, foundered, grounded, or otherwise lost during 1963.

January

8 January

12 January

13 January

20 January

23 January

24 January

31 January

February

4 February

6 February

7 February

11 February

15 February

25 February

28 February

March

13 March

15 March

18 March

19 March

20 March

24 March

27 March

28 March

Unknown date

April

1 April

10 April

12 April

16 April

21 April

23 April

24 April

26 April

29 April

30 April

Unknown date

May

1 May

5 May

8 May

20 May

22 May

31 May

Unknown date

June

2 June

5 June

6 June

7 June

8 June

13 June

17 June

18 June

19 June

26 June

27 June

July

1 July

2 July

4 July

8 July

9 July

11 July

14 July

15 July

17 July

21 July

24 July

25 July

August

1 August

4 August

7 August

14 August

September

2 September

4 September

6 September

13 September

19 September

21 September

22 September

23 September

24 September

25 September

27 September

Unknown date

October

2 October

8 October

11 October

13 October

14 October

21 October

22 October

23 October

24 October

27 October

November

1 November

2 November

13 November

14 November

17 November

19 November

Unknown date

December

8 December

14 December

18 December

20 December

21 December

22 December

23 December

24 December

25 December

29 December

30 December

31 December

Unknown date

References

See also 

1963
 
Ships